The 2009 The Citadel Bulldogs football team represented The Citadel, The Military College of South Carolina in the 2009 NCAA Division I FCS football season. The Bulldogs were led by fifth year head coach Kevin Higgins and played their home games at Johnson Hagood Stadium. They played as members of the Southern Conference, as they have since 1936.

Schedule

References

Citadel
The Citadel Bulldogs football seasons
Citadel Bulldogs football